Lios may refer to several places in Ireland:

Lios Ceannúir, or anglicized Liscannor, a coastal village in County Clare, Ireland
Lios an Gharráin, or anglicised Lissagurraun, a townland of Moycullen in County Galway, Ireland
Lios Póil, or anglicized Lispole, a Gaeltacht village in County Kerry, Ireland

See also
Lio (disambiguation)